The Professional Footballers' Association (PFA) is the trade union for professional association footballers in England and Wales. Founded in 1907, it is the world's oldest professional sport trade union, and has over 5,000 members.

The aims of the PFA are to protect, improve and negotiate the conditions, rights and status of all professional players by collective bargaining agreements.

The PFA is affiliated with the Professional Footballers' Association Scotland.  The Northern Ireland PFA disbanded in 1995.

Following internal and external criticism, the PFA committed to reform and modernise, adopting new governance rules in 2020 and a new chief executive in 2021, but later that year sparked protest when it decided not to publish an independent review.

History

The Players' Union

The PFA was formed on 2 December 1907 as the Association Football Players' and Trainers' Union (AFPTU; commonly referred to at the time as the Players' Union). On that date, Charlie Roberts and Billy Meredith (who had been involved in the AFU), both of Manchester United, convened the Players' Union at Manchester's Imperial Hotel.

This was the second attempt to organise a union of professional footballers in England, after the Association Footballers' Union (the "AFU"), formed in 1898, had been dissolved in 1901.  The AFU had failed in its objectives of bringing about a relaxation of the restrictions on the movement of players from one club to another in the Football League and preventing the introduction of a maximum wage of £4 per week for players in the Football League.

Like the AFU before it, the Players' Union intended to challenge the maximum wage and the restriction on transfers, in the form of the "retain and transfer" system.

Threatened strike action in 1909

When the Players' Union made its objectives clear in 1909, the Football Association withdrew its recognition of the Union, which at that time was seeking to join the U.K.'s General Federation of Trade Unions ('GFTU').

In response, the Union threatened strike action. The Football Association in turn banned players affiliated with the AFPTU before the start of the 1909–10 season. The ban saw membership of the Union fall. However, players from Manchester United refused to relinquish their membership. League clubs turned to amateur players to replace players that had been banned, but Manchester United were not able to find enough replacements, risking the cancellation of their opening fixture at home to Bradford City. The Manchester United players were called "Outcasts FC".

The deadlock swung in favour of the Union when Tim Coleman of Everton came out in support of the Union. Coleman's intervention resuscitated support for the Union, which regained its strength of numbers. Agreement was reached on official recognition for the Union in exchange for allowing bonus payments to be made to players to supplement the maximum wage. The maximum wage remained for more than another half century.

Continuing battles with the Football League
The 1910s saw the Union backing a challenge by Herbert Kingaby against the retain and transfer system in the courts. Kingaby brought legal proceedings against his former employers, Aston Villa, for preventing him from playing. The Players' Union funded the proceedings. Erroneous strategy by Kingaby's counsel resulted in the suit ending disastrously for the Union. The Union were almost ruined financially and membership fell drastically.

Although membership increased from 300 in 1915 to well over 1000 by 1920 this did not herald a new era of radicalism among the rank-and-file. Widespread unemployment heralded declines in attendance at Football League matches at a time when many clubs had, once again, committed themselves to expensive ground improvement programmes in the expectation that the post-war spectator boom would continue indefinitely. Inevitably, this caused financial difficulties at many clubs. Clubs believed their problems were due to players' excessive wages rather than over-expansion. In the spring of 1922, they persuaded the League authorities to arbitrarily impose a £1 cut to the maximum wage (£9 a week at that time) and force clubs to reduce the wages of players who were on less than the maximum. Legal proceedings backed by the Players' Union this time established that clubs could not unilaterally impose a cut in players' contracted wages.

Between 1946 and 1957 the Chairman of the Union was former Portsmouth captain Jimmy Guthrie. His book Soccer Rebel, published in 1976, documents his chairmanship and the struggle of the Union to improve the lot of professional footballers in the years preceding the abolition of the maximum wage.

In 1955, the union affiliated to the Trades Union Congress (TUC).

Modernisation

In 1956, Jimmy Hill became secretary of the Players' Union. He soon changed the union's name to the Professional Footballers' Association (the "PFA"), changing a blue collar image to one in keeping with the new wave of working-class actors and entertainers.

In 1957, Jimmy Hill became chairman of the PFA and campaigned to have the Football League's £20 maximum wage scrapped, which he achieved in January 1961. His Fulham teammate Johnny Haynes became the first £100 player.

The PFA also backed George Eastham in his legal action against the retain and transfer system, providing him with £15,000 to pay for his legal fees.  The case was brought against his former club, Newcastle United, in the High Court.  In 1963, The Court held that the retain and transfer system was an unreasonable restraint of trade.

From 1960, the union began representing trainers, and for a time was known as the "Professional Footballers' and Trainers' Association".

The union decided to register under the Industrial Relations Act 1971, something the TUC opposed.  As a result, it left the TUC in 1973, finally rejoining in 1995.

Sexism controversy

In 1997 some Sheffield United players invited their agent, Rachel Anderson, to the annual awards dinner. Anderson was turned away by then PFA Deputy Chief Executive Brendon Batson because she is a woman.

The following year, when West Ham United F.C. player Julian Dicks invited Anderson to attend the dinner, Anderson contacted the PFA to find out what their reaction would
be. On receiving a response that she would indeed be banned Anderson decided to go public and take
the PFA to court. As a result, the Minister for Sport, Tony Banks, and the Chief Executive of The Football Association, Graham Kelly boycotted the
event.

Anderson won in court and the financial cost to the PFA was considerable, Anderson suggests "over £200,000", of which she received £7,500 for "hurt feelings" and an undisclosed amount for "reasonable costs".

In 2013 the PFA instituted awards for the PFA Women's Players' Player of the Year. Kim Little was the recipient in the first year.

Dispute with Ben Purkiss 
In November 2018 it became public that Ben Purkiss' eligibility to be Chairman was in dispute. More than 200 players wrote an open letter calling on chief executive Gordon Taylor to stand down. Taylor wrote an open letter in response promising a full and open review of the union's structure and operation. At its 2018 AGM, held in Manchester in March 2019, it was agreed that Taylor, Purkiss and the entire management committee would stand down following the completion of a "full and open review" into the PFA's finances and its presentation at the 2019 AGM,

PFA Awards
In 1974, the PFA created three awards to be given to players – or people who have contributed a lot to the game – every year.
 Players' Player of the Year award: Given to the player voted the best of the season by his fellow players.
 Young Player of the Year award: Given to the young player voted the best of the season by the PFA.
 Merit Award: Given to the person who has contributed the most to football over the season, as voted for by the PFA.

In 1974 they introduced the first team based award:
 Team of the Year award: Given to eleven players in each league (forty-four players in total) who are deemed the best of the season by the PFA.

In 2001, they created another award:
 Fans' Player of the Year award: Given to the player voted the best of the season by the fans.

In 2013 and 2014 respectively, the PFA instituted the first female awards:
 PFA Women's Players' Player of the Year award: Given to the female player voted the best of the season by her fellow players.
 PFA Young Women's Player of the Year award: Given to the young female player voted the best of the season by the PFA.

At this time the PFA Player of the Year award was renamed Men's PFA Player of the Year and the PFA Young Player of the Year was renamed Men's PFA Young Player of the Year.

In 2020, the PFA added another award for the women:
 Fans' Women Player of the Year award: Given to the player voted the best of the WSL season by the fans.

Present day objectives
In association with other football bodies, the PFA are the managing agents for the "Football Scholarship Programme" and the "Football in the Community Programme".

It is a member of the Institute of Professional Sport and FIFPro – the confederation of international football players' unions – as well as the Trades Union Congress.

The PFA also fund various education programmes for ex and current players. The oldest is a link with the University of Salford which has been running since 1991 and which by 2007 had seen over 70 players complete degrees in Physiotherapy. Additionally players complete Sports Science degrees from Manchester Metropolitan University and Professional Sports Writing and Broadcasting degrees at Staffordshire University, in addition to other programmes including fitness training, training to become driving instructors and various other initiatives.

From 2001/02 season, the PFA worked closely with the Press Association as part of the Football Live project, to manage a team of up to 80 ex-professional footballers to provide statistical information live from all English Football Matches. This agreement switched to OPTA when they successfully took over the supply of data from 2012/13 season.

The PFA also funds a residential rehabilitation scheme that allows any injured member to attend the Lilleshall Sports Injury Rehabilitation centre for physiotherapy and sports injury treatment free of charge to the player or club. The scheme is designed to complement the medical care available at the players own club. Many club Physios refer their players to Lilleshall with the intention of providing a change of environment. This helps to maintain the motivation & interest of long term injured players. The free sports injury and physiotherapy services are based at the Lilleshall Hall National Sports Centre in Shropshire.

Centenary
2007 brought along the 100th year since the foundation of The Players Union, and to commemorate the centenary year, the PFA launched their "One Goal One Million" campaign. The campaign involved a whole year of celebratory fund-raising activities with the aim of raising £1 million to fully fund a new children's rehabilitation and physiotherapy unit at the University Children’s Hospital, Manchester. Throughout the year the PFA ran a number of high-profile events involving current and former players and managers with the sole purpose of reaching the £1 million target. Events included a pro-celebrity golf event, race days and initiatives involving younger supporters. On the day that the PFA was formed in 1907 – 2 December – there was a match between an England Legends XI – captained by Alan Shearer and managed by Terry Venables – and a World Legends XI – captained by Gianfranco Zola and managed by Jürgen Klinsmann – culminating in a gala dinner in the evening involving a host of top entertainers.

In December of the centenary year, the PFA issued Fans' Favourites; a list of the favourite players at each Football League club. In making the selection, the PFA canvassed the opinions of the supporters of present, and some former, League clubs about their favourite player.

Key personnel

Management committee
Omar Beckles (Chair)
Danielle Carter
Peter Clarke
Troy Deeney
Kevin Ellison
George Friend
Steph Houghton
Tom Heaton
Chris McCready
John Mousinho
Wes Morgan
Marvin Sordell
Peter Vincenti

Chairs
1907: Harry Mainman
1910: Evelyn Lintott
1911: Colin Veitch
1919: Charlie Roberts
1921: Jimmy Lawrence
1922: Jimmy Fay
1929: Howard Matthews
1930: Arthur Wood
1931: David Robbie
1936: Albert Barrett
1937: Sammy Crooks
1946: Jimmy Guthrie
1956: Jimmy Hill
1961: Tommy Cummings
1963: Malcolm Musgrove
1966: Noel Cantwell
1967: Terry Neill
1970: Derek Dougan
1978: Gordon Taylor
1980: Alan Gowling
1982: Steve Coppell
1983:
1984: Brian Talbot
1988: Garth Crooks
1990: Brian Marwood
1993: Pat Nevin
1997: Barry Horne
2001: Nick Cusack
2002: Richard Jobson
2003: Dean Holdsworth
2005: Chris Powell
2010: Clarke Carlisle
2013: Ritchie Humphreys
2017: Ben Purkiss
2021: John Mousinho
2023: Omar Beckles

Chief Executives
This position was originally named "secretary".

1907: Herbert Broomfield
1910: Albert Owen
1913: Harry Newbould
1929: Jimmy Fay
1953: Cliff Lloyd
1981: Gordon Taylor
2021: Maheta Molango

Deputy Chief Executives
 Not Applicable

PFA Executives
 Nick Cusack
 Richard Jobson
 Simon Barker

See also
Football Writers' Association
Professional Footballers' Association of Ireland
The Players' Union
The Football Association

References

Further reading 

 John Harding (2014) Behind The Glory The Official History of the Professional Footballers Association  DB Publishing 
 Jimmy Hill (1961) Striking for Soccer Peter Davies, London & Sportsmans Book Club, London 1963

External links
The Official website of the Professional Footballers' Association

1907 establishments in the United Kingdom
Association football trade unions
Football organisations in England
Trade unions established in 1907
Trade unions in the United Kingdom
Trade unions based in Greater Manchester
Trade unions affiliated with the Trades Union Congress